Alexander Durham (died 1584) was a Scottish courtier and administrator.

His appointments included, clerk in the Exchequer, administrator of John Stewart of Coldingham, and Master of the Wardrobe to King James VI. He was also known as "Sandy Durhame" or "Durame". Another member of the family, "Andrew" or Alexander Durham, worked in the spice house of the kitchen of Mary of Guise.

Durham was argentier or "argentar" to Mary of Guise and Mary, Queen of Scots. This role included taking receipt of an income funding the royal household called the "thirds of benefices" derived from teinds. The money was collected by men working for the exchequer, like George Wishart of Drymme. From 1 October 1565 up to 2 January 1568 he received £4833-6s-8d on top of £23,351-13-4d already paid to him from the Thirds, for the expenses of the houses and "avery" (horse fodder) of Queen Mary and James VI of Scotland.
 
In August 1564 Durham took up a contribution of £124-10s-8d from Coupar Angus Abbey towards the expenses of the queen's hunting trip in Atholl and Glen Tilt and her journey to Inverness. 

He died in 1584 and was buried at the Holy Rude Kirk in Stirling.

Alexander Durham, Lord Darnley's page
His son Alexander, also known as "Sandy Durham" was present at the Scottish court, a page to Lord Darnley. According to the confession of Nicholas Hubert alias French Paris, Mary wanted Gilbert Curle in her service to replace "Sande Duram" shortly before the murder of Lord Darnley. According to French Paris, Mary distrusted Durham. As a former servant of Lord Darnley in 1568, who was ready to work for James VI, being "of good mind to be employed to be employed in his minute and small affairs". He was made master of wardrobe of Prince James on 15 February 1567. Described as the late king's page, Alexander Durham was imprisoned in Edinburgh's tolbooth by Regent Moray in September 1567 on suspicion of involvement in Darnley's murder.

He became the "provisour" of the household of Regent Moray and of the king's household at Stirling Castle in the 1570s, and made a burgess of Stirling. Durham worked for Regent Moray in 1568, providing for his household. In March 1572 Durham paid for cloth to make gown and smocks for six children, an Easter ceremony. The number of gowns matched the age of James VI. He arranged for harpers to play for James VI at Stirling Castle in June 1579. The family came to own and rebuild Duntarvie Castle.

Family
Alexander Durham married Elizabeth Murray: Their children included:
 Alexander Durham younger, was a servant to Lord Darnley, and was bought green clothes in January 1566. In 1567 he was suspected of involvement in Darnley's murder. He was asked to bring a marten fur, a "couverture de maytres", a bedcover, from the Queen's chamber at the Kirk o'Field to Margaret Carwood. He may have been the father of Elizabeth Durham, who married William Baillie, Lord Provand
 James Durham of Duntarvie, a member of the royal household as clerk of expenses and a "daily servitour" who was suspected of involvement in the Raid of Holyrood in 1591.  He served as Chamberlain for Linlithgowshire between 1595 and 1600. He married Margaret Hepburn. She was invited to wait on Anne of Denmark at her coronation in May 1590. His daughter Janet Durham married James Durham of Pitkerrow (died 1633).

The main branch of the Durham family lived at the Grange of Monifieth (near Dundee). Eufame Durham (died 1580) was the wife of John Strachan or Strathauchin, the builder of Claypotts Castle. She was a sister of Robert Durham of the Grange of Monifeith.

References

1584 deaths
16th-century Scottish people
Court of Mary, Queen of Scots
Monarchy and money